Verónica Loyo is a Mexican singer and actress.

Partial discography 
 Aires de la provincia (Dimsa DML-8107)

Filmography 
 Los hijos de María Morales (1952)
 Canción de cuna (1953)
 Ahí vienen los gorrones (1953)
 Romance de fieras (1954)
 Los líos de Barba Azul (1955)
 Secreto profesional (1955)
 Pueblo quieto (1955)
 Bluebeard (1955)
 La fiera (1956)
 Rosalba (1956)
 El organillero (1957)
 Fiesta en el corazón (1958)
 Las tres coquetonas (1960)
 Los fanfarrones (1960)
 Locura de terror (1961)
 Un dorado de Pancho Villa (1967)

References

External links 
 

Living people
Ranchera singers
Bolero singers
Mexican film actresses
Year of birth missing (living people)
Place of birth missing (living people)
20th-century Mexican actresses
20th-century Mexican women singers